Battle of Kandahar may refer to:

 Battle of Kandahar (1880), the last major conflict of the Second Anglo-Afghan War 
 Battle of Kandahar (2001), the fall of the city in 2001, signaling the end of organized Taliban control of Afghanistan
 Battle of Kandahar (2011), an attack by the Taliban in May 2011
 Battle of Kandahar (2021), part of the 2021 Taliban offensive